Albert Township may refer to the following townships in the United States:

 Albert Township, Michigan
 Albert Township, Benson County, North Dakota